Roman Vladimirovich Amirkhanov (born 13 May 1989) is a Russian former professional footballer.

International career
Amirkhanov was one of the members of the Russian U-17 squad that won the 2006 UEFA U-17 Championship.

References

External links

1989 births
Living people
People from Revda, Sverdlovsk Oblast
Russian footballers
Russia youth international footballers
Russia under-21 international footballers
FC Sibir Novosibirsk players
PFC Spartak Nalchik players
Russian Premier League players
Skonto FC players
Expatriate footballers in Latvia
Russian expatriates in Latvia
FC SKA-Khabarovsk players
Association football defenders
FC Lokomotiv Moscow players
Sportspeople from Sverdlovsk Oblast